Zorman is a surname. Notable people with the surname include:

Itamar Zorman (born 1985), Israeli violinist
Ivan Zorman (1885-1957), Slovene poet
Ivo Zorman (1926-2009), Slovene writer
Moshe Zorman (born 1952), Israeli composer
Uroš Zorman (born 1980), Slovenian handballer